Reeth, Fremington and Healaugh is a civil parish in the Richmondshire district of North Yorkshire, England. It consists of the three villages of Reeth, Fremington and Healaugh.

As of the 2001 census, it had a population of 685, rising to 724 at the 2011 Census.

Governance
The civil parish is part of the  electoral ward of Reeth and Arkengarthdale. This ward has a total population taken at the 2011 Census of 1,230.

References

External links

Civil parishes in North Yorkshire